The Balaklava-Moonta railway line was a railway line on the South Australian Railways network. It ran across the top of the Yorke Peninsula.

History
The first part to be built was a horse-drawn tramway between the port at Wallaroo and mines near Kadina in 1862, followed by mines near Moonta in 1866. This was originally constructed as  gauge.

A separate isolated horse-drawn tramway was constructed to deliver grain from the plains east of Port Wakefield in the areas of Balaklava, Halbury and Hoyle's Plains (now Hoyleton) to that port. It opened in 1869.

The  gauge line from Port Wakefield reached a new junction with the Kadina-Brinkworth railway line at Kadina and opened on 9 October 1878. It continued to Wallaroo on a new track adjacent to the older broad gauge track. The line from Kadina to Barunga Gap had started construction from the Kadina end in 1877

A junction at Kadina connected the Brinkworth-Kadina line. The section from Kadina to Wallaroo was converted to dual gauge broad and standard gauges on 2 December 1982 after the Adelaide-Port Augusta line was converted to standard gauge.

The section from Balaklava to Paskeville closed on 4 April 1984, followed by the Wallaroo to Moonta section on 23 July 1984. The broad gauge section from Kadina to Wallaroo also closed on 23 July 1984, but the standard gauge line remained open until 3 March 1993. The Paskeville to Kadina section closed on 14 March 1990. After the railway closed, part of it was used by the Lions Club of Yorke Peninsula Railway for heritage tourist services, but this ceased operations in 2009.

The line between Wallaroo and Kadina has since been pulled up and replaced with a rail trail and retail stores on both ends.

References

External links
Gallery

Closed railway lines in South Australia
Railway lines opened in 1876
Railway lines closed in 1993
3 ft 6 in gauge railways
5 ft 3 in gauge railways in Australia
Standard gauge railways in Australia